"Secret Admirer" is a song by American rapper Pitbull featuring Lloyd. It was released on November 27, 2007, as single from Pitbull's third studio album The Boatlift. It has a riff to My Boo. The song was written by Pitbull, Oscar Salinas, Carl Mahone, Juan Salinas and David Terry and it was produced by Play-N-Skillz.

Music video
This video was directed by David Rousseau. It features both Pitbull and Lloyd.

Track listing
"Secret Admirer" (Album Version) – 3:18
"Secret Admirer" (Radio Edit) – 3:17
Source:

Charts

Release history

References

2007 singles
2007 songs
Pitbull (rapper) songs
Lloyd (singer) songs
TVT Records singles
Contemporary R&B ballads
Song recordings produced by Play-N-Skillz
Songs written by Pitbull (rapper)